{{DISPLAYTITLE:Nu2 Lupi}}

Nu2 Lupi (ν2 Lupi) is a 6th magnitude G-type main-sequence star located approximately 48 light-years away in the constellation of Lupus. The physical properties of the star are similar to those of the Sun, though Nu2 Lupi is significantly older.

Properties 
Nu2 Lupi is a bright star, barely observable with the naked eye in good observing conditions, that lies towards the bottom of Lupus near to the border with Norma and close to the galactic plane.

At over 1.6 arcseconds per year, Nu2 Lupi has a particularly large proper motion. This indicates that the star is nearby, which was confirmed by Earth-based parallax measurements during the last century such as that of the Gliese Catalogue of Nearby Stars, measuring 63.1 ± 7.8 milli-arcseconds. The much more accurate space-based Hipparcos parallax of 67.51 ± 0.39 milli-arcseconds gives a distance of 48.3 ± 0.3 light-years, making Nu2 Lupi one of the closest G-type main-sequence stars to the Sun. , the best parallax is  milli-arcseconds from Gaia DR3, corresponding to a distance of  light-years.

Somewhat surprisingly, Nu2 Lupi also has a large radial velocity of -68.7 km/s. When combined with its large proper motion, it becomes apparent that the star is moving much faster through the galaxy than the Sun. This indicates that the star is a member of an older, higher-motion stellar population, which is confirmed by the star's position on the Toomre diagram with Nu2 Lupi showing kinematics of a thick disk star. This means that Nu2 Lupi must be considerably older than the Sun, which is supported by its spectroscopic parameters: the depth of the star's iron spectral lines implies an iron abundance of -0.34 ± 0.01 dex, equalling 46 ± 1% of the solar iron abundance - a typical value for a thick disk star. Similarly, the star's surface gravity of log 4.39 ± 0.11 g is somewhat lower than is typical for a main-sequence G-type star and indicates modest evolution, which when combined with a spectroscopically derived mass of  implies an age of around 12.3 billion years, over twice the solar age. Nu2 Lupi is therefore probably one of the oldest stars in the solar neighbourhood.

Planetary system 

On September 12, 2011 three low-mass planets were announced in a preprint, using data from the HARPS spectrograph. These three planets are among about seven dozen planets discovered in September 2011, the most of any month up to that point during the exoplanet era that began in the early 1990s. The confirmation of these planets was published in Astronomy & Astrophysics in 2019. The two inner planets were also detected using the transit method in 2020, allowing a precise determination of their masses and radii. In 2021, planet d was also found to transit using observations from CHEOPS, allowing its mass and radius to be determined. Further transit observations with CHEOPS were used to refine the planetary parameters and to search for signs of an exomoon around planet d, although no evidence of a moon was found.

With a mass of about 5 Earth masses, the innermost planet falls into the regime of super-Earths, and was confirmed to be mostly rocky with a density of 7.8 g/cm3 in 2020. The outer two planets straddle the boundary between super-Earths and Neptune-mass planets, so they are less likely to have predominantly rocky compositions. The middle planet Nu2 Lupi c with a density of 3.5 g/cm3 is expected to have a large gaseous envelope. All three planets orbit within 0.5 AU and are likely too hot to maintain liquid water.

The most recent published observation of this system for debris disks was in 2006 by the Spitzer telescope, searching for an excess of infra-red light that would indicate scattering of starlight by dust or planetesimals; no infra-red excess was detected.

See also 
 Nu1 Lupi
 List of extrasolar planets detected by radial velocity
 82 G. Eridani
 Mu Arae

References

External links
 
 

G-type main-sequence stars
Solar-type stars
Planetary systems with three confirmed planets
Lupus (constellation)
Lupi, Nu2
CD-47 09919
0582
136352
075181
5699
2011
136916387